Grünstein (Watzmann) is a mountain of Bavaria, Germany.

Mountains of Bavaria
Berchtesgaden Alps
One-thousanders of Germany
Mountains of the Alps